Arugisa is a genus of moths in the family Erebidae.

Taxonomy
The genus was previously classified in the subfamily Hypeninae of the family Noctuidae.

Species
 Arugisa albipuncta Hampson, 1926
 Arugisa aliena Walker, 1865
 Arugisa gyrochila (Butler, 1879)
 Arugisa latiorella (Walker, 1863) (syn: Arugisa watsoni Richards, 1941)
 Arugisa lutea (Smith, 1900)
 Arugisa oppressa Schaus, 1911
 Arugisa punctalis (Barnes & McDunnough, 1916)
 Arugisa rubiginosa Hampson, 1926
 Arugisa subterminata Hampson, 1926

References
 Arugisa at Markku Savela's Lepidoptera and Some Other Life Forms
 Natural History Museum Lepidoptera genus database

Scolecocampinae
Moth genera